Colin Clark may refer to:

Colin Clark (economist) (1905–1989), British and Australian economist and statistician
Colin Clark (filmmaker) (1932–2002), British writer and filmmaker
Colin Clark (politician) (born 1969), British politician
Colin Clark (soccer) (1984–2019), American soccer player
Colin W. Clark (born 1931), Canadian mathematician and behavioural ecologist
Colin Clark of the Clark baronets
Colin Clark (golfer) in NCAA Division III Men's Golf Championships
"Colin Clark", the name under which Kryptonian orphan Kal-El (a.k.a. Superman) is raised in the alternate universe of Superman: True Brit

See also
Colin Clarke (disambiguation)